Founded in 1982, FoodDrinkEurope is a Food industry confederation in the European Union. It was formed by 26 national food-related federations, including 3 observers, 25 EU sector associations, and 19 major food and drink companies, all grouped in a Liaison Committee.

History
The organization was founded in 1982 as Confederation of the Food and Drink Industries of the EU (CIAA), and renamed as FoodDrinkEurope in June 2011.

Activities
FoodDrinkEurope develops the Guideline Daily Amounts pictograms displaying nutritional values on food packaging.

Policies
The organisation supports the proposed Transatlantic Trade and Investment Partnership, arguing that it will reduce regulatory barriers, increase employment and encourage industry investment.

References

External links
 

Pan-European food industry trade groups
Trade associations based in Belgium